Kenneth P. Mortimer is a scholar who was president of Western Washington University from 1988 to 1993, and the eleventh president of the University of Hawaiʻi system and chancellor of the University of Hawaiʻi at Manoa from 1993 to 2001. He received a Bachelor of Arts and Master of Business Administration from the University of Pennsylvania and a PhD from the University of California at Berkeley. He previously worked for Pennsylvania State University. He is a well-known scholar in the area of educational administration.  Currently he is engaged in writing, consulting, and serving on boards.  He is the author of several books including The Art and Politics of Academic Governance: Relations among Boards, Presidents, and Faculty.

References

Living people
Presidents of the University of Hawaii System
Leaders of the University of Hawaiʻi at Mānoa
Wharton School of the University of Pennsylvania alumni
University of California, Berkeley alumni
Pennsylvania State University faculty
Western Washington University faculty
Year of birth missing (living people)